"Fusion of horizons" is a dialectical concept which results from the rejection of two alternatives: objectivism, whereby the objectification of the other is premised on the forgetting of oneself; and absolute knowledge, according to which universal history can be articulated within a single horizon. Therefore, it argues that we exist neither in closed horizons, nor within a horizon that is unique.

People come from different backgrounds and it is not possible to totally remove oneself from one's background, history, culture, gender, language, education, etc. to an entirely different system of attitudes, beliefs and ways of thinking. People may be looking for a way to be engaged in understanding a conversation or dialogue about different cultures and the speaker interprets texts or stories based on his or her past experience and prejudice. Therefore, "hermeneutic reflection and determination of one's own present life interpretation calls for the unfolding of one's 'effective-historical' consciousness." During the discourse, a fusion of "horizons" takes place between the speaker and listeners.

Horizons to be fused
Gadamer defines a horizon as follows: 
Every finite present has its limitations. We define the concept of "situation" by saying that it represents a standpoint that limits the possibility of vision. Hence essential to the concept of situation is the concept of "horizon." The horizon is the range of vision that includes everything that can be seen from a particular vantage point. ... A person who has no horizon is a man who does not see far enough and hence over-values what is nearest to him. On the other hand, "to have an horizon" means not being limited to what is nearby but being able to see beyond it. ... [W]orking out the hermeneutical situation means acquiring the right horizon of inquiry for the questions evoked by the encounter with tradition.

See also
 Horizon of expectation
 Perspectivism
 Thesis, antithesis, synthesis

References

Concepts in epistemology
Dialectic
Hans-Georg Gadamer